Oswald Charles Baker (1915–2004) was a sedevacantist Roman Catholic priest who lived in Downham Market in Norfolk.

References

External links
Rev. Fr. Oswald Baker RIP, SedeVacantist.UK website

Sedevacantists
People from Downham Market
English traditionalist Catholics
Traditionalist Catholic priests
1915 births
2004 deaths